Barry Ashlin Williamson (born June 19, 1957) is an attorney from Austin, Texas, who was from 1992 to 1999 a Republican member of the Texas Railroad Commission. In 1992, he defeated the appointed incumbent Lena Guerrero, a Democrat, to win a seat on the three-member panel which regulates oil and natural gas operations (not railroads).

Williamson is the son of the former Alice Wicker, a native of Steele, Missouri, and Ashlin "Tunney" Williamson (1926–2011), a farmer and school board member who was born in Blytheville, Arkansas, but reared in Missouri. Barry Williamson himself was reared in Snow Lake in Desha County and in Elaine in Phillips County, both located along the Mississippi River in eastern Arkansas. Williamson and his wife, the former Holly Holt, have two sons, Holt Williamson and Ashlin Williamson. Williamson has three sisters, Jan W. Dunkerson of Rose Bud, Arkansas, Karen W. Tepovich of Houston, Texas, and Alecia W. Lybrand of Soldonta, Alaska. A brother, Tracy Williamson, is deceased.

Williamson did not seek a second term on the Railroad Commission in 1998, but he instead ran unsuccessfully in the Republican primary for Texas attorney general. He lost a runoff election to John Cornyn. A third candidate eliminated in the primary was Tom Pauken, the former state party chairman. Cornyn then defeated the Democratic former attorney general Jim Mattox in the 1998 general election.

In 2010, Williamson served as campaign chairman for Republican Railroad Commission nominee David J. Porter, a Certified Public Accountant from Midland and Giddings, who upset incumbent Victor G. Carrillo of Abilene, Texas, in the party primary. Porter then defeated the Democrat Jeff Weems in the general election held on November 2, 2010. Williamson formerly resided in Midland and Dallas, Texas.

References

1957 births
Living people
Texas Republicans
Members of the Railroad Commission of Texas
People from Desha County, Arkansas
People from Phillips County, Arkansas
People from Austin, Texas
People from Midland, Texas
People from Dallas
Texas lawyers
American businesspeople